The Kenya national badminton team is a badminton team that plays for Kenya in international competitions. It is controlled by Kenya's governing body for the sport, Badminton Kenya. The Kenyan team were champions at the 1979 Thomas & Uber Cups Preliminaries for Africa.

Participation in African Badminton Championships

Men's team

Mixed team

African Games 
As part of an effort to improve the country's performance, Kenya sent 290 athletes to the 2019 African Games. As part of this effort, the Kenya national badminton team participated in the badminton events.

Commonwealth Games

1982 

The team participated in  during the 1982 Commonwealth Games.

2006 

2010 

The Kenya national badminton team was among the competitors during the mixed team event of the 1982 Commonwealth Games.

2014 

In participating in the 2014 Commonwealth Games, Kenya's national team was ranked the 18th seed for their competition. They finished last place within Pool B.

Statistics

2018 

At the 2018 Commonwealth Games, Kenya did not participate in the mixed team event. Instead, players Mercy Joseph and Victor Odera represented the country at the mixed doubles event. Additionally, they competed in the women's and men's singles, respectively.

Sudirman Cup 
At the 2019 Sudirman Cup, while Kenya was scheduled to participate, the team unexpectedly withdrew.

See also 
 Kenya International

References 

Badminton
National badminton teams
Badminton in Kenya